was a Japanese linguist, born in Tsuruga, Fukui Prefecture, Japan.

Biography
Hashimoto is especially noted for the discovery of Jōdai Tokushu Kanazukai, which makes it clear that Old Japanese made more syllabic distinctions than later periods of the language. This discovery led him to hypothesize that Old Japanese had eight vowels, while modern Japanese has only five. His systematic description of the Japanese grammar also laid the foundations of language education for Japanese children.

See also
Japanese literature
List of Japanese authors

References

1882 births
1945 deaths
Japanese writers
Linguists from Japan
People from Tsuruga, Fukui
University of Tokyo alumni
20th-century linguists
Linguists of Japanese